The Saudi Arabia Royal Cup (Japanese サウジアラビアロイヤルカップ) is a Grade 3 horse race for two-year-old Thoroughbreds run in October over a distance of 1600 metres at Tokyo Racecourse.

The race was first run under its current name in 2014 and was promoted to Grade 3 status in 2016. It had previously been known as the Icho Stakes.

Winners since 2000

See also
 Horse racing in Japan
 List of Japanese flat horse races

References

Turf races in Japan